Clarkia cylindrica is a species of flowering plant in the evening primrose family known by the common name speckled fairyfan, or speckled clarkia.

It is endemic to California, where it grows in the chaparral, oak woodlands, and grasslands of the southern California Coast Ranges, western Transverse Ranges,  and southern Sierra Nevada foothills.

Description
Leaves are mainly linear in shape and up to six centimeters long.

The inflorescence holds several flowers which hang heavily when they are buds and then grow erect as they open. Each open flower is a bowl of four fan-shaped petals up to about 3.5 centimeters long. The petals are intergrading shades of lavender, white, and magenta and they are often speckled with purple or pink. Beneath the petals are bright pink fused sepals. There are eight stamens with lavender anthers.

The fruit is a cylindrical capsule up to 5 centimeters long.

External links

Jepson Manual Profile: Clarkia cylindrica
Clarkia cylindrica — U.C. Photo gallery

cylindrica
Endemic flora of California
Flora of the Sierra Nevada (United States)
Natural history of the California chaparral and woodlands
Natural history of the California Coast Ranges
Natural history of the Santa Monica Mountains
Natural history of the Transverse Ranges
Plants described in 1907
Flora without expected TNC conservation status